may refer to:

 "Kaze wo Atsumete", a 1971 song by Happy End from their album Kazemachi Roman
 Kaze o Atsumete (Aqua Timez album), a 2006 album by Aqua Timez